Novoseljani is a suburb of the city of Bjelovar 

Populated places in Bjelovar-Bilogora County